Myshkin is a town and the administrative center of Myshkinsky District in Yaroslavl Oblast, Russia, located on the steep left bank of the Volga. Population:

History
A settlement at this location has existed since at least the 15th century. Town status was granted to it in 1777. It was demoted in status to that of an urban-type settlement in Soviet times, but was granted town status again in 1991.

Administrative and municipal status
Within the framework of administrative divisions, Myshkin serves as the administrative center of Myshkinsky District. As an administrative division, it is incorporated within Myshkinsky District as the town of district significance of Myshkin. As a municipal division, the town of district significance of Myshkin is incorporated within Myshkinsky Municipal District as Myshkin Urban Settlement.

Tourism and culture

The town attracts a significant number of tourists usually arriving by river cruise ships. Myshkin retains architectural features characteristic for the 19th century Russia. It also features a number of museums. One of them is the unique Mouse Museum (the name of the town is derived from the word "" (mysh) meaning mouse in Russian). There are also a Museum of Valenki (valenki being a type of Russian felt boots), an ethnographic museum, an art gallery, an open air retro car museum and more.

Notable people
German Tatarinov (1925–2006), painter

References

Notes

Sources

External links
Official website of Myshkin 
Website of the Mouseland Museum
Pictures of Myshkin

Cities and towns in Yaroslavl Oblast
Myshkinsky Uyezd
Populated places on the Volga
Golden Ring of Russia